T.V. Eye may refer to:

 "T.V. Eye", a 1970 song by The Stooges, released on their second studio album Fun House 
 TV Eye Live 1977, a 1978 live album by Iggy Pop
 TV Eyes, an American synthpop group